Korbin Rose Albert (born October 13, 2003) is an American professional footballer who plays as a midfielder for Division 1 Féminine club Paris Saint-Germain. Albert has also appeared for the United States national team at various youth levels including most recently for the U20 team at the 2022 FIFA U-20 Women's World Cup.

Early life

Albert was born in Grayslake, Illinois, a suburb of Chicago, and rose to prominence amongst the USYNT player pool while playing for Eclipse Select Soccer Club. During this time period, Albert represented the US's youth national set-up at various age groupings and was also named the player of the season for Eclipse's league in her area twice (2018–19 and 2020–21).

College career

Albert reclassified and joined the University of Notre Dame a year early in 2021. During two seasons with the university, Albert received a number of individual honors for her performance. For the 2021 season, she was named as part of the nationwide freshmen Best XI while also being named third-team All-ACC.

In her second and final season in 2022, Albert was a first-team All-American and All-ACC selection. Albert was also named the ACC's Midfielder of the Year and was a finalist for the Hermann Trophy given to the best collegiate player in the country. Albert scored three times in four knockout stage matches of the 2022 NCAA Tournament, but her team were eliminated by conference rivals North Carolina at the quarterfinal stage.

Club career
On January 31, 2023, Albert officially gave up her final two years of eligibility with Notre Dame to sign for Paris Saint-Germain on an initial two-and-a-half year contract.

International career
Albert has been an American youth international at various different levels. In June 2022, Albert was part of the squad that represented the United States at the Sud Ladies Cup where the team were crowned champions. On July 25, 2022, Albert was named in the US' squad for the U-20 Women's World Cup in Costa Rica. She started two matches at the tournament though the United States was eliminated in the group phase.

Honors

Individual
Hermann Trophy Finalist: 2022
ACC Midfielder of the Year: 2022
NCAA Division I Women's All-American: 2022 
All-ACC: 2021 (3rd Team), 2022 (1st Team), 
ECNL Player of the Year: 2018–19, 2020–21

References

2003 births
Living people
American women's soccer players
United States women's under-20 international soccer players
Soccer players from Illinois
People from Grayslake, Illinois
Sportspeople from Lake County, Illinois
Notre Dame Fighting Irish women's soccer players
Women's association football midfielders
Paris Saint-Germain Féminine players
Division 1 Féminine players
American expatriate women's soccer players
American expatriate sportspeople in France
Expatriate women's footballers in France